José Garces (born 21 November 1960) is a Mexican weightlifter. He competed in the men's middle heavyweight event at the 1984 Summer Olympics.

References

1960 births
Living people
Mexican male weightlifters
Olympic weightlifters of Mexico
Weightlifters at the 1984 Summer Olympics
Place of birth missing (living people)
20th-century Mexican people